Henry Fleming Lea Devereux, 14th Viscount Hereford PC (9 February 1777 – 31 May 1843) was a British Tory politician. He served as Captain of the Honourable Corps of Gentlemen-at-Arms between 1827 and 1830 and again between 1834 and 1835.

Background and education
Devereux was the son of George Devereux, 13th Viscount Hereford, and Marianna Devereux. His maternal grandfather was George Deveraux, of Tregoyd, a distant relation to the line of his father. He was educated at Winchester and Trinity College, Oxford.

Political career
Devereux succeeded his father in the viscountcy in 1804 and took his seat on the Tory benches in the House of Lords. In 1827 he was appointed Captain of the Honourable Band of Gentlemen Pensioners under Lord Goderich, a post he held until 1830, the last two years under the premiership of the Duke of Wellington. He held the same office (in 1834 renamed Captain of the Honourable Corps of Gentlemen-at-Arms) from 1834 to 1835 under Sir Robert Peel. In 1830 he was admitted to the Privy Council.

Family
Lord Hereford married Frances Elizabeth Cornewall, daughter of Sir George Cornewall, 2nd Baronet and Catherine Cornewall, on 12 December 1805. They had six children:

Hon. Henry Cornewall Devereux (1807 – 14 September 1839), unmarried.
Robert Devereux, 15th Viscount Hereford (3 May 1809 – 18 August 1855).
Hon. Walter Bourchier Devereux (3 November 1810 – 15 May 1868). A Rear-Admiral in the Royal Navy.
Hon. Humphrey Bohun Devereux (29 June 1812 – 19 May 1880), a Deputy Lieutenant of Herefordshire. He married Caroline Antrobus, daughter of Sir Edmund Antrobus, 2nd Baronet. The marriage was childless.
Hon. Frances Catherine Devereux (19 May 1814 – 12 January 1857), married Thomas Joseph Bradshaw, a barrister.
Hon. George Talbot Devereux (12 January 1819 – 14 February 1898). A Major-General in the British Army. Married Flora Mary MacDonald, mother of Arthur Annesley, 11th Viscount Valentia from a previous marriage.

Lord Hereford died in May 1843, aged 67, and was succeeded in the viscountcy by his eldest surviving son, son Robert. The Viscountess Hereford died in February 1864.

References

1777 births
1843 deaths
People educated at Winchester College
Alumni of Trinity College, Oxford
Honourable Corps of Gentlemen at Arms
Members of the Privy Council of the United Kingdom
Henry
Henry 14